Umm al-Zaytun (also spelled Umm ez-Zeitoun) is a village in the al-Suwayda Governorate in southwestern Syria. It is situated along the southeastern edge of the Lejah lava plateau, northwest of the city of al-Suwayda. Umm al-Zaytun had a population of 1,913 in the 2004 census. Its inhabitants are Druze.

History
Umm al-Zaytun had been abandoned sometime in the middle Ottoman era, but was settled by Druze prior to 1810. It was one of the earliest Druze settlements in the Lejah plateau. The village was controlled by the Bani Amer clan. 

In 1838, it  was noted as a village, situated "the Luhf, east of the Lejah, i.e. in Wady el-Liwa".  

In 1839, Ibrahim Pasha, the Egyptian governor of Syria, sent a conscription expedition of 100 cavalry to subdue the Druze of Hauran. The latter engaged and destroyed Ibrahim Pasha's troops at Umm al-Zaytun. The Egyptian army withdrew from Syria in 1841 and Ottoman rule was restored. Umm al-Zaytun joined the Hauran Druze Rebellion of 1910 was subdued by Ottoman troops commanded by Badr Khan Bey.

Archaeology
Roman Empire-era structures are located in Umm al-Zaytun. In particular are the ruins of a religious building with a large stone facade and a room with niches suited for statues. The inscription found at the building date to 282 CE and mention and describe the building as a "sacred kalybe". This type of building is relatively unique in Syria, being found only in Umm al-Zaytun and nearby Shaqqa and Hayyat.

See also
 Druze in Syria

References

Bibliography

1800s establishments in the Ottoman Empire
Archaeological sites in as-Suwayda Governorate
Druze communities in Syria
Populated places in Shahba District